Cristian Manuel Núñez (born August 2, 1980) is a retired Argentine footballer,

Career

Núñez has spent the majority of his career in the regionalized fourth and third divisions of Argentina, playing in Boca Unidos. After a season on loan with Newell's Old Boys, he agreed to join Quilmes for the 2010-11 Argentine Primera División season. However, Quilmes refused to close the deal after the club's doctors discovered he had joined the team injured. In July 2012, he was loaned out to Primera División side Unión de Santa Fe.

References

External links
Argentine Primera statistics at Fútbol XXI 

Living people
1980 births
Argentine footballers
Association football forwards
Argentine Primera División players
Primera Nacional players
Primera B Metropolitana players
Torneo Federal A players
Torneo Argentino A players
Newell's Old Boys footballers
Unión de Santa Fe footballers
Club Almirante Brown footballers
Boca Unidos footballers
People from Resistencia, Chaco
Sportspeople from Chaco Province